STNNNG (pronounced 'Stunning') was an American noise rock band from Minneapolis, Minnesota. Formed in 2003, they played over 400 live shows in the United States, England, France, and Belgium. STNNNG released four full-length albums on the Twin Cities-based Modern Radio record label before splitting up in 2017.

History
For their first two years as a band, STNNNG performed as the quartet of Chris Besinger (vocals), Adam Burt (guitar), Nathan Nelson (guitar), and J. Michael Ward (drums). Their first releases, 2004's split 7-inch with Chicago's The Means and 2005's debut album, Dignified Sissy, were recorded with this lineup. The cover of Dignified Sissy features Bear Attack, a painting by historical artist Mort Kunstler.

STNNNG's second album, Fake Fake, was the first to feature Jesse Kwakenat (also of Heroine Sheiks) on bass. Fake Fake was recorded and engineered by Mike Lust at Lust Manor in Chicago.

STNNNG's 3rd full-length album, The Smoke of My Will, was released in October 2010. The album was the band's first after the departure of original drummer J. Michael Ward in August 2009. He was replaced by Ben Ivascu (also known for playing drums in Poliça, Marijuana Death Squads, and Signal to Trust) as a permanent member.

In February 2013, STNNNG released Empire Inward, an eight-song album recorded at Electrical Audio studio in Chicago, Illinois, and engineered and mixed by Steve Albini.

In 2017 they released Veterans of Pleasure, the band's final album, on which they again worked with Albini.

STNNNG announced their immediate disbanding after a show in September 2017.

The band's final release was a split EP with Child Bite, released in November 2017.

Discography

Albums
Dignified Sissy CD/LP (2005), Modern Radio
Fake Fake CD/LP (2006), Modern Radio
The Smoke of My Will LP (2010), Modern Radio
Empire Inward CD/LP (2013), Rejuvenation/Modern Radio
Veterans of Pleasure LP (2017), Modern Radio

Singles & Compilations
Means/STNNNG Split 7-inch (2004), Nodak
Ladies & Gentlemen No. 2 (2006), Ladies & Gentlemen Magazine - compilation LP
Stuck on AM Vol. 5 (2006), Radio K - compilation CD
STNNNG/Signal to Trust Split 7-inch (2007), Modern Radio
Radio K (2007), Radio K - compilation CD
Stuck on AM Vol. 6 (2008), Radio K - compilation CD
Stuck on AM 7: Stuck On Tape (2011), Radio K - compilation cassette
89.3 The Current - Local Current Volume 1 (2011), The Current - compilation CD
Doom Town U$A (2011), Doom Town - compilation cassette
STNNNG/Child Bite split EP (2017), Forge Again

References

External links

Musical groups from Minnesota
Musical groups established in 2003
Musical groups disestablished in 2017